is a Japanese company specializing in the creation and distribution of media related to anime, such as producing OVAs, radio dramas, drama CDs, anime soundtracks, or other related products. The company was established in August 1990.

Projects involved with

Anime
Air
Apparently, Disillusioned Adventurers Will Save the World
Binbō Shimai Monogatari
Comic Party
Esper Mami
Gun Parade March: Arata Naru Kōgen Uta
Hetalia: Axis Powers
Higurashi no Naku Koro ni
Jewelpet Twinkle
Karin
Maria-sama ga Miteru
Marmalade Boy
Oh, Suddenly Egyptian God
Papuwa
Saiunkoku Monogatari
Saiyuki Reload
tactics
The Mythical Detective Loki Ragnarok
To Heart
To Heart 2
Tsuki wa Higashi ni Hi wa Nishi ni: Operation Sanctuary
Wind: A Breath of Heart
Zettai Muteki Raijin-Oh
No-Rin

OVA
Aki sora
Mizuiro
Saint Beast
Utawarerumono

Soundtracks
Lucky Star series
Maria-sama ga Miteru 1 series
Clannad Film Soundtrack (2007)

Drama CDs
Akaya Akashiya Ayakashi no
Black Butler
Cat Paradise
Drama CD Lucky Star
DJCD Maria-sama ga Miteru
Higurashi no Naku Koro ni
Kamui
Karneval Carnival
Maria Holic
Pandora Hearts Drama CD
Sekirei Original Drama CD
SERVAMP
Shoulder-a-Coffin Kuro
Taishō Baseball Girls: Young Ladies Hiking 
DJCD The Idolmaster
Tasogare Otome × Amunejia Original Drama CD
Triggerheart Exelica Parallel Anchor
Venus Versus Virus
Yandere Kanojo

Magazines
Daria

References

External links
Official website 

Japanese companies established in 2002
Amusement companies of Japan
Mass media companies established in 2002
Anime companies